Logan, Indiana may refer to:
Logan, Dearborn County, Indiana
Logan, Lawrence County, Indiana